The Rural Municipality of Invermay No. 305 is a rural municipality (RM) in the Canadian province of Saskatchewan within Census Division No. 9 and  Division No. 4.

History 
The RM of Invermay No. 305 incorporated as a rural municipality on December 11, 1911.

Geography 
The following rivers, lakes and streams are located in the RM.

Rivers and lakes
 Whitesand River
 Stonewall Lake
 Saline Lake
 Dog Lake
 Newburn Lake
 Silver Lake
 Woody Lake

Creeks and streams
 Spirit Creek
 Conjuring Creek

Geography

Communities and localities 
The following urban municipalities are surrounded by the RM.

Villages
 Invermay
 Rama

The following unincorporated communities are within the RM.

Localities
 Dobrowody
 Dernic
 Netherton
 Lone Spruce
 Mitchellview

Demographics 

Attractions 
 Grotto of our Lady of Lourdes in Rama
 The Invermay Fair

Government 
The RM of Invermay No. 305 is governed by an elected municipal council and an appointed administrator that meets on the second Wednesday of every month. The reeve of the RM is Bev Whyatt while its administrator is Dana Jack. The RM's office is located in Invermay.

Transportation 
 Saskatchewan Highway 5
 Saskatchewan Highway 617
 Saskatchewan Highway 754
 Canadian National Railway

See also 
List of rural municipalities in Saskatchewan

References 

I

Division No. 9, Saskatchewan